The Boston African American National Historic Site, in the heart of Boston, Massachusetts's Beacon Hill neighborhood, interprets 15 pre-Civil War structures relating to the history of Boston's 19th-century African-American community, connected by the Black Heritage Trail. These include the 1806 African Meeting House, the oldest standing black church in the United States.

Overview 
The historical site is located on Beacon Hill, a neighborhood just north of Boston Common. The site was designated in 1980 to "preserve and commemorate original buildings that housed the nineteenth-century free African-American community on Beacon Hill." That year President Jimmy Carter signed bills authorizing this and the Martin Luther King, Jr. National Historic Site, as well as one to establish the National Afro-American Museum and Cultural Center in Wilberforce, Ohio. He said:

The two bills that I will sign today represent a three-pronged effort to preserve a vital, but long neglected, part of American heritage; the history and culture of Americans of African ancestry and their role in the history of our nation.

Boston's first African residents arrived as slaves in 1638 with early colonists. Over time, more of their descendants were born free to white mothers; in other cases slaveholders freed slaves for service. After the American Revolutionary War, Massachusetts effectively abolished slavery by the terms of its new constitution. By the 1790 census, no slaves were recorded in Massachusetts. Subsequently, a sizable community of free Blacks and escaped slaves developed in Boston, settling on the north face of Beacon Hill, and in the North End. With a strong abolitionist community, Boston was long considered a desirable destination for southern Black slaves escaping slavery via the Underground Railroad. African Americans became activists in the abolition movement, also working to gain racial equality and educational parity with whites. They engaged in political processes to meet their objectives.

Before the Civil War, more than  half of the 2,000 African Americans in Boston lived on the north slope of Beacon Hill; blacks also lived in the West End north of Cambridge Street, and in the North End. These areas gradually were occupied by new groups of immigrants after African Americans moved to southern areas of Boston. (The North End became a center of Italian immigrants in the late 19th and early 20th centuries.)

The historic site is one of 39 African-American Heritage Sites of the National Park Service.

Black Heritage Trail 

The National Park Service wrote:
The historic buildings along today's Black Heritage Trail®  were the homes, businesses, schools and churches of a thriving black community that organized, from the nation's earliest years, to sustain those who faced local discrimination and national slavery, struggling toward the equality and freedom promised in America's documents of national liberty.

Historical sites along the 1.6 mile (2.5 km) Black Heritage Trail in Beacon Hill include:

 Robert Gould Shaw / 54th Massachusetts Volunteer Regiment Memorial – commemorates the first African-American regiment of the United States Colored Troops during the Civil War and the officer who led the 54th Regiment until his death at the Battle of Fort Wagner in SC. This monument depicts their farewell march down Beacon Street, which was erected at the edge of Boston Common, across Beacon Street from the Massachusetts State House. Poet Robert Lowell won a Pulitzer Prize in the 20th century for his poem, "For the Union Dead," about this monument and soldiers. The regiment's heroic battle at Fort Wagner was the subject of the film Glory (1989). 
 African Meeting House – built in 1806, the oldest standing African-American church in the country is operated as part of the Museum of African American History. Displays include speeches from well-informed orators. Built in 1806, the meeting house is the oldest surviving African-American church building in the United States; it became known as the Black Faneuil Hall during the abolitionist movement. Here Frederick Douglass gave many speeches, including his impassioned call for blacks to take up arms against the South in the American Civil War.
 Abiel Smith School – built in 1834, now adapted and operated as the Museum of African American History
 Charles Street Meeting House –  built in 1807, the church had segregated seating. In the 1830s some of the members formed the First Baptist Free Church, which became Tremont Temple. It was considered to be one of the first integrated churches in America. 
 John Coburn House – home of John Coburn, an African-American abolitionist, soldier and recruiter, who aided people on the Underground Railroad. 
 Lewis and Harriet Hayden House – Lewis Hayden was an escaped slave, abolitionist leader, recruiter for the 54th regiment during the Civil War. Afterward, he became a Grand Master of the Prince Hall Masons and was elected as a member of the Massachusetts House of Representatives. Active with the Underground Railroad, Hayden protected escaped slaves in his home, including Ellen and William Craft.
 George Middleton House – One of the oldest standing homes in Beacon Hill. Middleton led the black militia, Bucks of America, during the Revolutionary War. He helped found the Free African Society and served as Grand Master of the Prince Hall African Masonic Lodge.
 Phillips School – one Boston's first integrated schools
 Smith Court Residences – The five Smith Court homes typify those of black Bostonians in the 1800s. Two notable residents of 3 Smith Court are William Cooper Nell and James Scott, both involved in the abolitionist cause. Nell was an author and considered one of the nation's first black historians.
 John J. Smith House – Smith was an abolitionist leader who helped fugitive slaves on the Underground Railroad. He recruited for the all-black 5th Cavalry during the Civil War. Afterward he was elected as a three-term member of the Massachusetts House of Representatives. Smith lived in this house from 1878–1893.

Most sites on the trail are still used as residences and are not open to the public, except the African Meeting House, Abiel Smith School, and the 54th Regiment Memorial.

Park rangers provide free, two-hour guided tours of the trail during the summer; off-season tours are available by reservation. A self-guided trail map and information is available online, at the Boston African American Historic Site, the Boston National Historic Site center, and at the Abiel Smith School.

Educational programs 
Staff collaborated on the Freedom Rising: The 150th anniversary of the Emancipation Proclamation and African Military Service in the Civil War on May 2–4, 2013. The multi-day and multi-location program in Boston included historian Henry Louis Gates and actor Danny Glover, with exhibits at Harvard University and the Museum of African American History.

Black Boston highlights (1638–1909)

19th century population 
 While the black population increased markedly during this period, extensive immigration from Europe overshadowed that growth, with new immigrants from Ireland, Italy, the Russian and Austro-Hungarian empires, and other parts of eastern and southern Europe.

See also
National Register of Historic Places listings in northern Boston

References

Further reading
 
 
 
Linda Matchan. "Newcomer’s efforts boost Black Heritage Trail’s profile", Boston Globe, 14 May 2012

Governmental publications

External links
 Boston African American National Historic Site (NPS)
Museum of African American History

African-American history in Boston
History of Boston
Buildings and structures in Boston
National Historic Sites in Massachusetts
Massachusetts in the American Civil War
Museums in Boston
African-American museums in Massachusetts
Beacon Hill, Boston
National Register of Historic Places in Boston
Protected areas established in 1980
1980 establishments in Massachusetts